Bundaberg Sugar is a company involved in all aspects of sugar manufacture, including growing and milling the sugarcane and refining and marketing the sugar. It operates principally in the Bundaberg Region, Queensland, Australia.

History 
Bundaberg Sugar Company Limited was created in 1972 from the merger of the Fairymead Sugar Company Limited and Gibson & Howes Limited. Through these, the company can trace its history back to 1870 when the Fairymead Sugar Plantation was first established.

In 2013, the company entered into an agreement with Pacific Gold Macadamias to purchase its waste product, approximately 2,000 tonnes of macadamia nut shells each year, which will be burned as a fuel to process the bagasse (the waste product of sugar milling) into biofuel.

In 2014, the company purchased 14 new water irrigators which use 50% less power than the older style and are expected to increase sugarcane yields by 5-10%.

The BIngera sugar mill was closed in 2020.

Sugar mills 
As of 2022 Only one mill remains in operation.

 Millaquin mill at East Bundaberg

Formerly they had other mills operating in the region:
 Qunaba Mill
 Fairymead Mill
 Bingera mill at South Kolan

See also 

 List of sugar mills in Queensland

References

Further reading

External links 

 

Sugar companies of Australia
Sugar mills in Queensland
Sugar plantations in Australia
Bundaberg